Elizabeth Ayoub is a Venezuelan singer and actress of Lebanese descent. She performs in Spanish, Arabic, English, and French, though emphasizing the Latino and Arabian music scenes. Her first album, Prelude (2006), was released via Sony BMG and was followed by Oceanos y Lunas in 2010 via Four Quarters Records, a distributed label of E1 Entertainment. Elizabeth commutes between New York City, Beirut, and Miami, where she is currently at work promoting her music and taking on new projects.

Prelude (2006)

Her debut album, Prelude, was released in 2006 under Sony-BMG. The official track listing, as listed by her website elizabethayoub.com, is as follows:
 Je T'Attends (I Wait for You)
 Hawa (Love)
 Navego (Drifting
 Mr. Jones
 Scheherazade
 Lesh (Why)
 Creo (I Believe)
 Swept Away
 Ya Oud (Oh! Oud)
 Ya Oud (a capella)

Oceanos y Lunas (2010)

In February 2009, Elizabeth announced her return to the Latin-Arabian music scene with her second album, titled Oceanos y Lunas. The album was released in May 2010 with an opening concert in New York City to promote the album. Eight new tracks were featured, along with four tracks from her debut album Prelude. The track list, according to her website, elizabethayoub.com, is as follows:

 Oceanos y Lunas
 Verano
 Habibi
 Je T'Attends (I Wait for You)
 Creo
 Azul
 Pintame
 Baeid
 Navego
 Deseo
 Volver
 Ya Oud (Oh! Oud)

Discography
Prelude (2006)

Oceanos y Lunas (2010)

References

Year of birth missing (living people)
Living people
Actresses from Caracas
21st-century Venezuelan women singers
Musicians from Caracas
Arab Venezuelan
Venezuelan people of Lebanese descent